Stealing of a Nation is the third LP by the New York City Dance-punk band Radio 4. It was released on September 7, 2004.

Track listing
Party Crashers
Transmission
State of Alert
FRA Type 1 & II
The Death of American Radio
Nation
No Reaction
Absolute Affirmation
(Give Me All of Your) Money
Shake the Foundation
Dismiss the Sound
Coming Up Empty

References

2004 albums
Radio 4 (band) albums
Astralwerks albums